The Journal of Nutrition (or shortened as  JN  or  J Nutr) is a peer-reviewed scientific journal published by the American Society for Nutrition. Established in 1928, the journal publishes experimental research on human, animal, cellular and molecular nutrition; biographies and assessments on nutritional researchers; and commentaries on controversial issues in the field. In 2020, its editor-in-chief was Dr. Teresa A. Davis. According to the Journal Citation Reports, The Journal of Nutrition had an impact factor of 4.281 in 2019—a decline from its 2018 rating of 4.416.

References

External links 
 

Publications established in 1928
Nutrition and dietetics journals
Monthly journals
English-language journals